Esther Morgan may refer to:

 Esther Morgan (footballer) (born 2002), Welsh international footballer
 Esther Morgan (poet) (born 1970), British poet